Serpin I2 is a protein that in humans is encoded by the SERPINI2 gene.

Function 

The protein encoded by this gene is a member of the serine protease inhibitor (serpin) superfamily made up of proteins which play central roles in the regulation of a wide variety of physiological processes, including coagulation, fibrinolysis, development, malignancy and inflammation. The gene product may have a role in a growth-control, possibly growth-suppressing pathway and, when impaired, may be involved in pancreatic carcinogenesis. The protein is a member of the plasminogen activator inhibitor-1 family, a subset of the serpin superfamily whose members act as tissue-specific tPA inhibitors. Two alternatively spliced transcript variants encoding distinct protein isoforms have been found for this gene.

References

Further reading

External links 
 The MEROPS online database for peptidases and their inhibitors: I04.026